Reeson is a surname. Notable people with the surname include:

Margaret Reeson (born 1938), Australian historian and writer
Sammy Reeson (born 1963), English boxer
Tony Reeson (1933–1990), English footballer
Joseph Newell Reeson (1868–1953), Australian civil engineer
Warren Christopher Reeson (born 1966), English Canadian muralist and artist

See also
Reesor (disambiguation)